Rafael Yugueros (born 8 September 1977 in Oviedo, Asturias, Spain) is the drummer of the power metal band WarCry where he played, until the band's split, and rejoined in September, 2007. With influences from Metallica, U2, Pink Floyd, The Police, Led Zeppelin and Death.

Career
In 1986, when The Final Countdown was released Yugueros, along with his cousin, built a home-made drum composed of, cans?!! From that moment he never got away from the drums, and music in general, especially Rock and Metal, but he liked Jazz too, after listening to The Jazz Messengers, by Art Blakey. 

Once he had his own drums, in 1994, he began to play on some bands until he formed part of WarCry, in 1997.

After the band's split he played on many other bands, like Darna and DarkSun. 

Meanwhile, he was part of an orchestra and various groups with different music-styles, such as Blues, Jazz and Pop. Receiving classes from various music-professors like Félix Morales. He combines his music with intense activity with the facet of durum-professor.

Discography

WarCry 
 Demon 97 (Demo) (1997)
 Revolución (2008)
 Alfa (2011)
 Omega (2012)
 Inmortal (2013)

Darna 
 Darna (2001)
 II (2003)

DarkSun 
 El Lado Oscuro (2006)
 The Dark Side (2007)

Personal information
 Name: Rafel Yugueros.
 Birthplace: Oviedo, Asturias, Spain.
 Date Of Birth: September/09/1977.
 Instrument: Drums.
 In WarCry: 1997-1998, 2007–present
 Influences: Art Blakey, Lars Ulrich, Terry Bozzio, Vinnie Colaiuta...
 Formations: WarCry, DarkSun, Darna.
 First CD: Symphony No. 5 (Beethoven).

Faves

 Band: Symphony X.
 Drink: Pepsi.
 Food: Pato A La Naranja & Tarta De Avellanas.
 Film: Alien.
 Nonmusical Likings: Hiking And Caressing My Cat
 Song Of WarCry: Nana.
 Song Of El Sello De Los Tiempos: Alejandro.
 Song Of Alea Jacta Est: Espíritu De Amor.
 Song Of ¿Dónde Está La Luz?: Nuevo Mundo.
 Song Of Another Band: "Fate Speaks" - Explorers Club.
 Concert: U2 - Vertigo Tour (On Barcelona)

External links
WarCry's Official Website

1977 births
Living people
People from Oviedo
WarCry (band) members